Aydar may refer to:

People 
Aydar Akhatov, Russian state, political and public figure, journalist, scientist-economist, ecologist, lawyer, artist.
Aydar Nuriev, Russian racing driver
Mariana Aydar, Brazilian singer
Seher Aydar, Norwegian politician
Zübeyir Aydar, Kurdish politician

Other uses 
Aydar, Belgorod Oblast, locality in Russia
Aydar Lake, Uzbekistan

See also
 Aidar (disambiguation)